Lola Glaudini (born November 24, 1971) is an American actress. She is best known for her portrayal of Elle Greenaway on CBS's Criminal Minds and for her role as Deborah Ciccerone-Waldrup on HBO's The Sopranos.

Early life
Glaudini was born in Manhattan, New York. Her father, Robert Glaudini, is a playwright of Italian descent, and in whose play The Poison Tree she appeared at the Mark Taper Forum in Los Angeles. Her mother, Nina Diane (née Kapler) Rosen, is from a Jewish family and is a writer and college instructor in California.

Glaudini attended Bard College. She also starred in the drama Demonology at the Mark Taper Forum, for which she won a Drama-Logue Award as Best Actress.

Career
Between 2001 and 2004 Glaudini had a recurring role on the HBO series The Sopranos as Federal Agent Deborah Ciccerone-Waldrup. In 2005 she was a regular on the CBS series Criminal Minds as Elle Greenaway, but left the show early in the second season. Before those roles she appeared on NYPD Blue as Dolores Mayo, a heroin-addicted office assistant. She has guest starred in The Good Guys, The King of Queens, Andy Richter Controls the Universe, Boomtown, Special Unit 2, Law & Order: Criminal Intent, Las Vegas, Monk, and ER. Glaudini also appeared briefly in the Neil LaBute film Your Friends & Neighbors.

In the 2006 film Invincible, Glaudini had a brief role as the first wife of Vince Papale, played by Mark Wahlberg, where she is seen berating Papale's career failures and informs him of divorce. She played Kat Damatto on the NBC mini-series Persons Unknown in 2010. She costarred with Mark Harmon in the 2011 USA original movie Certain Prey, based on the bestselling book of the same name by John Sandford.

Personal life
Glaudini lives in Los Angeles with her husband, Stuart England, and two sons.

Filmography

References

External links

1971 births
Actresses from New York City
American film actresses
American people of Italian descent
American television actresses
Bard College alumni
Living people
People from Manhattan
People from Brooklyn
Jewish American actresses
21st-century American Jews
21st-century American women